Mone may refer to:

People

Mononym
 Mone (Burmese actress) (born 1992) Burmese television and film actress

Surname
 Arbër Mone (born 1988), Albanian footballer
 Bryan Mone (born 1995) American football nose tackle
 Dessie Mone, Irish Gaelic footballer
 Franz Mone (1796–1871), German historian and archaeologist
 Guy Mone (died 1407), English royal administrator and bishop
 Hawise Mone (fl. 1428–1430), English Lollard in Norfolk in the fifteenth century
 Jean Mone (c. 1500 – c. 1548), Brabant sculptor
 John Mone (1929–2016), Scottish bishop
 John Paul Mone, Irish Gaelic footballer
 Michelle Mone, Baroness Mone (born 1971), Scottish entrepreneur
 Miriam Mone (1965–2007), Irish fashion designer
 Robert Mone (born 1948), Scottish murderer
 Rory Mone, Irish Gaelic footballer
 Sanjay Mone, Marathi actor, dialogue writer and script writer

Given name
 Mone Chiba (born 2005), Japanese figure skater
 Moné Hattori (born 1999), Japanese violinist
 Mone Inami (born 1999), Japanese professional golfer
 Mone Kamishiraishi (born 1998), Japanese actress and singer
 Mone Wamowe (born 1986), New Caledonian footballer

Places
 Mongnai State, a former state in today's Myanmar

See also
 C-Mone
 Moné
 Mone Mone
 Mones (disambiguation)

Japanese feminine given names